Papuasia is a Level 2 botanical region defined in the World Geographical Scheme for Recording Plant Distributions (WGSRPD). It lies in the southwestern Pacific Ocean, in the Melanesia ecoregion of Oceania and Tropical Asia. 

It comprises the following geographic and political entities:

 Aru Islands (Indonesia; treated as part of Western New Guinea in the Scheme)
 New Guinea
 Papua New Guinea
 Western New Guinea (Indonesia)
 Solomon Islands (archipelago)
 Bougainville
 Solomon Islands (excluding the Santa Cruz Islands)

References

Australasian realm
 
Biogeography
Geography of Melanesia

Natural history of New Guinea
Natural history of Papua New Guinea
Natural history of Western New Guinea